Kobi Baladev is a former Israeli footballer. He is mainly known for playing with Maccabi Netanya for over ten years and also as the former CEO of the club.

Honours
Israeli Premier League:
Runner-up (1): 1987-88
Toto Cup:
Runner-up (1): 1988-89

References

External links
Profile on IFA

1966 births
Living people
Israeli Jews
Israeli footballers
Hapoel Nof HaGalil F.C. players
Maccabi Netanya F.C. players
Maccabi Herzliya F.C. players
Liga Leumit players
Association football goalkeepers